Andrew Booth Jr. (born September 28, 2000) is an American football cornerback for the Minnesota Vikings of the National Football League (NFL). He played college football at Clemson and was drafted by the Vikings in the second round of the 2022 NFL Draft.

Early years
Booth Jr. attended Archer High School in Lawrenceville, Georgia. During his career he had 162 tackles 13 interceptions. He played in the 2019 Under Armour All-America Game. A five-star recruit, he committed to Clemson University to play college football.

College career
Booth Jr. played in 13 games as a true freshman at Clemson in 2019, recording four tackles. As a sophomore in 2020, he started four of 11 games, recording  27 tackles, two interceptions, one sack and fumble recovery for a touchdown.
 He also played for the Tigers in 2021. On January 9, 2022, Booth declared for the 2022 NFL Draft.

Professional career 

Booth was selected by the Minnesota Vikings with the 42nd pick in the 2022 NFL Draft.

On November 28, 2022, Booth had knee surgery and missed the rest of his rookie season.

References

External links
 Minnesota Vikings bio
Clemson Tigers bio

2000 births
Living people
People from Dacula, Georgia
Players of American football from Georgia (U.S. state)
Sportspeople from the Atlanta metropolitan area
American football cornerbacks
Clemson Tigers football players
Minnesota Vikings players